Souhalia Alamou (born 31 December 1979) is a retired Beninese athlete specialising in the sprinting events. He competed at one Olympic Games and three World Championships without reaching the second round.

Competition record

N.B. Competed at the 1999 African Junior Champsionships in Rades Tunisia but his results were excluded due to being over-age.

Personal bests
Outdoor
100 metres – 10.31 (wind: +1.1 m/s) (Lugano SUI June 5, 2004)
200 metres – 20.95 (Cotonou 2004)
Indoor
60 metres – 6.92 (Budapest 2004)

External links
 

1979 births
Living people
Beninese male sprinters
Olympic athletes of Benin
Athletes (track and field) at the 2004 Summer Olympics
World Athletics Championships athletes for Benin
Athletes (track and field) at the 1999 All-Africa Games
Athletes (track and field) at the 2003 All-Africa Games
African Games competitors for Benin